Keo Koumane, or Nu Muang Kaeva Kumara, Nokeo Koumane was born No Muong (Phragna Nakorn-Noi No Muang Keo Koumane) (1571–1596) was King of Lan Xang reigning from 1571 till 1572 and from 1591 till 1596. He was the son of King Sai Setthathirath I by his wife, "Kaew Pra Kham" a daughter of King Sen Soulintha.

In 1571, upon the death of his father, he was proclaimed King and reigned under the regency of his maternal grandfather, Sen Soulintha. In 1572, he was deposed by him. In 1575, was taken prisoner by the Burmese and sent to Burma.

He was released from captivity by King Nanda Bayin of Toungoo Dynasty and returned to Vientiane. He was crowned at Vientiane in 1591. He declared his state's independence from the Burmese in 1593, but suffered several attacks from them throughout his reign.

He died in 1596.

References 

Kings of Lan Xang
Year of birth unknown
16th-century births
1596 deaths
16th-century Laotian people
16th-century monarchs in Asia
Laotian Theravada Buddhists